De Mil Colores (English: Of a Thousand Colors) may refer to:
De Mil Colores (Daniela Romo album), 1992
De mil colores (Rosario Flores album), 2003